Saeed Al-Zahrani (born July 23, 1992) is a Saudi football player. He currently plays for Al-Safa as a winger.

Club career
On the 4 November 2012, Al-Zahrani made his debut for Al-Wahda in a 1-0 home defeat to Al-Raed played at the King Abdul Aziz Stadium. Al-Zahrani's first goal for Al-Wahda came in a 2-1 defeat to Hajer on the 29 December 2012. Al-Zahrani's 71st-minute strike turned out to be a consolation because of Hajer's Abdoh Hakami and Abdallatif Albahdari goals which were both converted from the penalty spot. Al-Zahrani also featured in games against the likes of current Saudi Professional League champions Al-Fateh and Al-Hilal, Saudi Arabia's most successful football club.

References

1992 births
Living people
Saudi Arabian footballers
Al-Wehda Club (Mecca) players
Al-Fayha FC players
Al-Kawkab FC players
Al-Riyadh SC players
Al Safa FC players
Saudi First Division League players
Saudi Professional League players
Saudi Second Division players
Association football forwards